The North Fork Toutle River is a tributary of the Toutle River in southwestern Washington in the United States. The largest tributary is the Green River, which joins near the unincorporated town of Toutle.

The North Fork's watershed was severely affected by the 1980 eruption of Mount St. Helens, which coated the valley with ash and filled it with successive mudflows. The result of the eruption was that many hillsides were stripped of forest, and as a result erosion has increased dramatically and the North Fork is now extremely laden with sediment. Previously, Spirit Lake was the source of the river, but eruptions blocked the outlet and Spirit Lake no longer drains directly into the North Fork; instead, a tunnel was excavated in 1985 to connect the lake with South Coldwater Creek, a tributary of the North Fork. Once a mature river, the North Fork has transformed into a braided stream of relatively young origin, and its valley floor is less than three decades old. The Toutle River Sediment Retention Structure was built by the U.S. Army Corps of Engineers on the river in 1989 to prevent this sediment from traveling downstream and clogging the shipping channel of the Columbia River.

The upper part of the North Fork Toutle River watershed was redirected to the crater of Mount St. Helens itself until 1982.

See also
List of rivers of Washington
List of tributaries of the Columbia River

References

External links
Background about the river from USGS website

Toutle River North Fork
Braided rivers in the United States
Rivers of Cowlitz County, Washington
Toutle River North Fork
Toutle River North Fork
Toutle River North Fork